NitroSecurity Inc. was a privately held United States-based provider of security information and event management (SIEM) technology. NitroSecurity headquarters are located in Portsmouth, New Hampshire, USA, with sales offices throughout the United States and in the United Kingdom. Primary software engineering development for all SIEM products was in Idaho Falls, Idaho. It was acquired by McAfee in 2011. Engineering of the SIEM products continue to be developed at McAfee.

In 2010, Inc. magazine rated NitroSecurity #523 of the "Inc. 5,000 List of Fastest-Growing Companies".

Products
NitroSecurity develops Security Information and Event Management (SIEM) tools to identify, correlate, and remediate information security threats. The product names are NitroView ESM, NitroView ELM, NitroView ADM, NitroView DBM and NitroGuard IPS.

Achievements
 Gartner Magic Quadrant Leader
 SC Magazine Lab Approved
 InfoWorld 2011 Technology of Year Award
 SC Magazine Recommended
 SC Magazine Innovators Hall of Fame
 SC Magazine Top 20 Products in 20 Years

References

Technology companies established in 1999
Computer security companies
Companies based in New Hampshire
Defunct software companies of the United States
American companies established in 1999